The Ven. Sidney Harvie-Clarke (26 July 1905 –  13 February 1991) was Archdeacon of Birmingham from 1947 until 1967; and then Stow until 1975

He was educated at St Paul's School, London; Jesus College, Cambridge and Westcott House, Cambridge; and ordained in 1931. He held curacies at St Mary, Gateshead and St Mary, Portsea. He held Incumbencies in Jarrow, Edinburgh, Wishaw,  and  Harborne.

References

1905 births
People educated at St Paul's School, London
Alumni of Jesus College, Cambridge
Alumni of Westcott House, Cambridge
20th-century English Anglican priests
Archdeacons of Stow
Archdeacons of Birmingham
1991 deaths